My Brother The Wind is an improvisation collective consisting of Anekdoten's Nicklas Barker, Makajodama’s Mathias Danielsson, and Magnolia's Ronny Eriksson & Tomas Eriksson. They have recorded two albums of totally improvised psychedelic rock. They are associated with Swedish underground bands such as Träd, Gräs & Stenar & Dungen. Both albums have entered the Swedish charts, which is rare for improvised music.

Discography

Studio albums 
 Twilight In The Crystal Cabinet (2010)
 I Wash My Soul In The Stream Of Infinity (2011)
 Once There Was A Time When Time And Space Were One (2014)

Live albums 
 Live At Roadburn 2013 (2014)

References

External links 
 
 

Swedish psychedelic rock music groups